Kukadło  is a village in the administrative district of Gmina Bobrowice, within Krosno Odrzańskie County, Lubusz Voivodeship, in western Poland.

The village has a population of 46.

Notable residents
 Georg Wenzeslaus von Knobelsdorff (1699–1753), Prussian painter and architect

References

Villages in Krosno Odrzańskie County